Mautern an der Donau is a town in the district of Krems-Land in the Austrian state of Lower Austria.

Geography
It is situated on the southern bank of the Danube opposite Krems.

History
In former times ships cruising the Danube had to pay a toll when they passed Mautern. The town got its name from there because toll translates as "Maut" in German. 

Before it got this name it was called Favianae by the Romans because it was a very important fort.

Being an important merchant point in the Middle Ages, it gained additional importance as the bridge over the Danube River was built (a steelwork as of 1895).

Population

Places of interest 
A museum dedicated to the Roman Empire times, when Castell Faviani was in place of today's town centre. Also a part of the Roman wall (Römerwand) can be found here.

The Roman Catholic parish church of st. Stephanus is now of baroque appearance, but the Christian faith has its roots in times of the Saint Severinus of Noricum. who died here and has organised some refugee retreats in the area for people driven off their homes by Huns.

The cycle path Donauradweg leg 6 comes to the town along the right bank and crosses the Danube river. The highway bridge has also a pedestrian pathway offering interesting river view and being a steel work of interest per se.

Twin towns
Mautern an der Donau is twinned with:

  Mautern in Steiermark, Austria

References

Gallery

Cities and towns in Krems-Land District